Inner tube water polo (ITWP) is a variant of water polo with the important difference that players, excluding the goalkeeper, are required to float in inflatable inner tubes.  By floating in an inner tube, players experience less contact and expend less energy than traditional water polo players, not having to tread water. This allows casual players to enjoy water polo without undertaking the intense conditioning required for conventional water polo.

This sport is predominantly played at universities, but can also be found in recreational adult leagues.

History 
The game was invented in 1969 by now retired UC Davis associate athletic director of intramural sports and sport clubs, Gary Colberg.

References

External links 

https://www.bostonitwp.com

ITWP

Water polo variants
Team sports
Ball games
Sports originating in the United States
University of California, Davis
1969 establishments in the United States